Nestares is a village in the province and autonomous community of La Rioja, Spain.

Places of interest

Church of St. Martin.
Church of St. Martin. Built in the early sixteenth century and enlarged in the XVIII, has a nave divided into three sections including a square head lower and narrower. The choir is placed on a ribbed tercelete and presents a seating for 14 seats, and an eighteenth-century rococo organ. The sacristy has a domed cover on scallops and has a crucifix inside classicist of the second quarter of the seventeenth century . The altarpiece presents images of San Pedro, San Martin and San Pablo . At the top stands a life-size Asunción.

Ermita de la Virgen de Manojar
It is situated on a hill near the village. The building is constructed in brick masonry and protected by a masonry wall facing the open door. It has a nave of three bays covered with groin vaults supported on arches perpiñanos Tuscan batteries.

Ermita de San Bartolomé
Located 2.5 km northwest of the town, accessed by the track which connects with the Sierra de Moncalvillo .

References

Populated places in La Rioja (Spain)